Witch Hunt is a 2013 South Korean variety talk show starring Shin Dong-yup, Sung Si-kyung, Heo Ji-woong, Yoo Se-yoon that first aired on August 2, 2013. It airs on JTBC every Friday at 23:00. This show ended on December 28, 2015.

Hosts

Current hosts

Former hosts

Secondary Hosts

Episode Guest(s)

References

External links
 

2013 South Korean television series debuts
Korean-language television shows
JTBC original programming
South Korean variety television shows
South Korean television talk shows